Tasman Joseph McKee  (7 May 1911 – 7 February 1973) was a New Zealand industrial and agricultural chemist, geologist, company director. He was born in Nelson, New Zealand, on 7 May 1911 and was educated at Tasman and Mapua Schools, Wellington's St Patrick's College, Motueka District High School and Nelson College.

In the 1966 New Year Honours, McKee was appointed an Officer of the Order of the British Empire for services to industry, particularly to mineral development.

References

1911 births
1973 deaths
People from Nelson, New Zealand
People educated at Motueka High School
People educated at Nelson College
People educated at St. Patrick's College, Wellington
New Zealand chemists
20th-century New Zealand geologists
New Zealand Officers of the Order of the British Empire